I Want to Live is a 1982 Croatian film directed by Miroslav Mikuljan, starring Fabijan Šovagović, Milan Štrljić and Ena Begović.

External links
 

1982 films
1980s Croatian-language films
Croatian drama films
1982 drama films
Yugoslav drama films